Protilema papus is a species of beetle in the family Cerambycidae. It was described by Vitali and Menufandu in 2010. It is known from Indonesia.

References

Morimopsini
Beetles described in 2010